The Ukrainian Embassy in Ljubljana is the diplomatic mission of Ukraine in Slovenia. The embassy building is located at Mivka 27 in Ljubljana. The Ukrainian ambassador to Slovenia has been Andriy Taran since 2022.

History

After the collapse of the Soviet Union, Ukraine declared itself independent in August 1991. Slovenia recognized Ukraine as an independent state on 11 December 1991.

The establishment of diplomatic relations with Slovenia was agreed on 10 March 1992. The diplomatic representative was the ambassador in Budapest until 2004. until the embassy in Ljubljana was opened in 2004. Ivan Hnatyshyn was the first resident ambassador to be accredited.

There are currently around 2000 Ukrainians living in Slovenia.

Embassy building in Slovenia 
The embassy is located at Mivka 27 in the south of the Slovenian capital.

Ambassador and envoy of Ukraine in Slovenia 

Ivan Hnatyshyn (2004-2006)
Stanislav Yezhov (2006-2007)
Vadym Prymachenko (2007-2011)
Nataliia Fialka (2011)
Mykola Kyrychenko (2011-2015)
Mykhailo Brodovych (2015–2022)
Andriy Taran (since 2022)

See also
 Slovenia-Ukraine relations
 List of diplomatic missions in Slovenia
 Foreign relations of Slovenia
 Foreign relations of Ukraine

References

Slovenia–Ukraine relations
Ljubljana
Ukraine